Viola Wilson  (1 November 1911 – 6 February 2002) was a Scottish singer, the leading soprano for J. C. Williamson's Gilbert and Sullivan company in Australia during World War II. She married the widowed theatre businessman Frank S. Tait, later Sir Frank.

History
Wilson was born Violet Wilson Hogg in Pressburg, Austria/Hungary, youngest daughter of Violet Hogg and Gavin Hogg of Paisley, Scotland.
She trained as a pianist, then studied singing at the Glasgow Royal Academy; Father Sydney MacEwan was a fellow-student. She joined the Carl Rosa Opera Company, touring South Africa, and played Gilbert and Sullivan (G.& S.) with D'Oyly Carte in London and on Broadway. In 1940 she was brought out to Australia by J. C. Williamson's as leading soprano for their G.& S. company.

They opened on 16 March 1940 at the Theatre Royal, Sydney with The Gondoliers, in which Wilson's  (as Casilda) rendition of "There Was a Time" was praised. The Yeomen of the Guard (as Elsie) followed, then Iolanthe (as Phyllis), The Mikado (Yum Yum), then Patience and Princess Ida (both in the name parts). A similar program then followed at His Majesty's Theatre, Melbourne, running for 22 weeks, an Australian record. Frank Tait, managing director of J. C. Williamson's, hosted a party for the company after the last curtain. He announced that the company would be kept together for the duration of the war, though it might mean departing from the G.& S. canon to play such as Balfe's opera, The Bohemian Girl, Wallace's Maritana and the operetta Lilac Time.

They left for New Zealand on 26 December, for a four-month tour. 
In April 1941, while at Dunedin on the last leg of their tour, Wilson and Tait announced their engagement, their wedding set for 16 August.

The company returned to Australia, playing at His Majesty's Theatre, Brisbane from 24 April to 24 May. Many playgoers sported tartan accessories on the final night as a compliment to Wilson.  
Adelaide followed on 31 May and Perth from 28 June and the company was back in Melbourne playing The Gondoliers from 2 August. Wilson was playing Casilda on the eve of her marriage
The wedding was a joyful, informal occasion, with all the G.& S. company taking part. Evelyn Gardiner's husband Lieut.-Col. Richard Lister York gave the bride away, as her father could not make the trip. Viola's friend Sara Gregory was bridesmaid, and her singing teacher Francesca Duret sang Grieg's "I Love Thee" during the signing of the register. Both husband and wife made speeches at the reception, held at their home on Hopetoun Road, Toorak.
Marie Bremner took Wilson's place in the company while the couple was on their brief — taking a holiday was not in Tait's nature — honeymoon in Brisbane, the Gold Coast and Sydney.
Still billed as "Viola Wilson", she was back with the company in Melbourne for a week from 6 September, playing Princess Ida, Evelyn Gardiner attracting particular praise. Then followed the old favorites Pinafore, Ruddigore (as Rose Maybud), and Mikado, with a planned revival of The Sorcerer (as Aline), plus Lilac Time, a favorite often included in Australian G.& S. seasons.
Sydney followed with a double bill of Pirates and Trial by Jury followed by The Yeomen of the Guard and the rest. In April 1942 the company played Strauss's operetta Nightbirds, with Wilson as Adele. The Gondoliers followed, with Wilson again playing Casilda, replaced by Elva Blair on several occasions when Wilson was indisposed, and again in June playing Phyllis for Wilson in Iolanthe.

In February 1943 they were back in Melbourne with the promised Lilac Time with Wilson as Lilli to John Fullard's Schubert. In that year a G.& S. opera was broadcast for the first time in Australia, live and in full, though some dialogue was excised; The Gondoliers in January with Pirates and Iolanthe in February. The principal performers were Ivan Menzies, Viola Wilson, Evelyn Gardiner, and Bernard Manning.

For three years her appearances on stage were sporadic; on 31 May she gave birth to a daughter Isla Frances Tait, Isla being also the name of Wilson's sister. When Gladys Moncrieff was unable to appear at that year's Carols by Candlelight, due to commitments with the troops in New Guinea, Wilson volunteered. She also participated in patriotic and charitable functions, appearing with Gracie Fields at a concert for soldiers at Puckapunyal. A second daughter, Viola Anne, was born on 20 December 1944.

She returned to the popular stage in June 1946 as Maria Ziegler in Ivor Novello's The Dancing Years with Max Oldaker, produced by Leontine Sagan to good but not glowing reviews. 
In 1947 Mr and Mrs Tait made a four-month visit to Scotland, leaving their two little daughters in Melbourne.
A third daughter, Sally, was born 16 July 1949.

Later activities include many years' adjudicating at finals of the £1,000 Mobil Quest talent show, whose winner in 1950 was Joan Sutherland.
She was also on the judging panel for the inaugural Miss Australia Quest in 1954.

Tait was appointed a Member of the Order of Australia in the 1990 Australia Day Honours for service to the performing arts. She was instrumental in the foundation of the Tait Memorial Trust in 1992.

Lady Viola Tait died on 6 February 2002. She left her large collection of theatrical memorabilia to the Victorian Arts Centre.

Publications

See also
Frank S. Tait#Family includes his second family with Viola Tait.

References 

1911 births
2002 deaths
20th-century Australian women opera singers
Members of the Order of Australia